The Recea (also: Valea Plopilor) is a left tributary of the river Cerna in Romania. It flows into the Cerna in Slătioara.

References

Rivers of Romania
Rivers of Vâlcea County